Manduca wellingi is a moth of the  family Sphingidae. It is found from Mexico to Belize.

It is similar to Manduca pellenia, but is smaller.

References

Manduca
Moths described in 1984